Anthony Buller may refer to:

 Anthony Buller (1613–1679), English soldier and Member of Parliament
 Sir Anthony Buller (1780–1866), English lawyer and Member of Parliament